Dorothy Ann Drew (2 November 1934 – 1 May 2001) was a British diver. She competed in the women's 3 metre springboard event at the 1952 Summer Olympics.

References

External links
 
 

1934 births
2001 deaths
British female divers
Olympic divers of Great Britain
Divers at the 1952 Summer Olympics